Laurey is a French surname

 Joy Laurey, French writer
 Thierry Laurey, French professional football manager and former player
 Nuihau Laurey, French politician and former vice-president of French Polynesia

See also
 Laureys (disambiguation)
 Laurie (disambiguation)